Stephen Marche (born 1976) is a Canadian novelist, essayist, and cultural commentator. He is an alumnus of The University of King's College and of City College of New York (CUNY). In 2005, he received a doctorate in early modern English drama from the University of Toronto. He taught Renaissance drama at CUNY until 2007, when he resigned in order to write full-time.

Career as writer
Marche is a contributing editor at Esquire, for which he writes a monthly column entitled "A Thousand Words about Our Culture". In 2011, this column was a finalist for the American Society of Magazine Editors award for columns and commentary. Marche's articles also appear in The New York Times, The New Yorker, The Atlantic, The Walrus, The Guardian, and other publications.  Marche is also a weekly contributor to CBC Radio.

Marche's novel Raymond and Hannah was published in 2005. An anthology of short stories linked by a common plot element, Shining at the Bottom of the Sea, followed in 2007. How Shakespeare Changed Everything was published in 2011. Another novel, The Hunger Of The Wolf, was published in February 2015. Marche's take on the state of male–female relations in the 21st century, The Unmade Bed: The Messy Truth About Men and Women in the Twenty-First Century, was published in March 2017 with contributions from his wife.

Marche wrote an opinion piece published by The New York Times on August 14, 2015, titled "The Closing of the Canadian Mind." In this article he was critical of Stephen Harper, the Prime Minister of Canada, linking him with Rob Ford, former Mayor of Toronto who was involved in a crack cocaine scandal. Marche also published an opinion piece in The New York Times on November 25, 2017, titled "The Unexamined Brutality of the Male Libido," about the challenges and necessity of male engagement with feminism.

Marche wrote an essay published by The New York Times Book Review on February 26, 2023, titled "A Writer's Lament: The Better You Write, the More You Will Fail".  The essay discussed writing and failure and noted that "failure" is normal for writers much of the time, and that near-obsessive persevering in the face of failure to be published is the true mark of a writer.  In particular, he noted that a writer may have commercial success at times, but still, their best work may be the biggest failure (perhaps only recognized after a writer has died--using Melville's Billy Budd as an example).  In the last paragraph of the essay, Marche wrote: "Good writers offer advice.  Great writers offer condolences."

Personal life
Marche is married to Sarah Fulford, the former editor-in-chief of Toronto Life magazine. Fulford is a daughter of Canadian journalist Robert Fulford. Marche and Fulford have a son and daughter, and live in Toronto.

Bibliography

Novels

 (2015). The Hunger Of The Wolf.

Short fiction

 (2007). Shining at the Bottom of the Sea.

Non-fiction
 (2011). How Shakespeare Changed Everything.
 (2017).The Unmade Bed: The Messy Truth About Men and Women in the Twenty-First Century.
 (2022). The Next Civil War: Dispatches from the American Future.
(2023)  On Writing and Failure: Or, On the Peculiar Perseverance Required to Endure the Life of a Writer (Field Notes)

Essays and Reporting

 (August 14, 2015). "The Closing of the Canadian Mind." The New York Times.
 (November 17, 2017). "The Unexamined Brutality of the Male Libido." The New York Times. 

 (April 20, 2019). "The 'debate of the century': what happened when Jordan Peterson debated Slavoj Žižek". The Guardian.

References

External links
 

1976 births
Living people
21st-century Canadian male writers
21st-century Canadian novelists
21st-century Canadian short story writers
Canadian columnists
Canadian social commentators
Canadian male novelists
Canadian male non-fiction writers
Canadian male short story writers
Esquire (magazine) people
University of Toronto alumni
Writers from Edmonton